is a dam in Jōetsu, Niigata Prefecture, Japan, completed in 2003.

References 

Dams in Niigata Prefecture
Dams completed in 2003